Nandy may refer to:
 Nandy (surname)
 Nandy (singer) (born 1987), Tanzanian singer and songwriter
 Nandy, Seine-et-Marne, a commune in north-central France
 Nandy, a character from the TV series Cro
 Shanidar I or Nandy, Neanderthal skeleton found at Shanidar Cave

See also 
 Nandi (disambiguation)